On the Red Front is a 1920 Soviet silent adventure film directed by Lev Kuleshov.

Cast
 Aleksandra Khokhlova as Polish peasant  
 Lev Kuleshov as Polish Peasant  
 Leonid Obolensky as Red Army soldier  
 A. Reikh as Polish spy

References

Bibliography 
 Christie, Ian & Taylor, Richard. The Film Factory: Russian and Soviet Cinema in Documents 1896-1939. Routledge, 2012.

External links 
 

1920 films
1920 adventure films
Soviet adventure films
Soviet silent films
1920s Russian-language films
Films directed by Lev Kuleshov
Soviet black-and-white films